The Liga Dominicana de Fútbol is the first professional football league in Dominican Republic, it was launched in March 2015. For sponsorship reasons it is known as LDF Banco Popular.

History
Prior to the league's establishment, football in the Dominican Republic is only played in amateur level, partly due to football not being the top sport among Dominicans, who are more inclined to baseball and basketball.

To address the issue and to raise the status of football in the country, the Dominican Football Federation has decided to implement the idea of a new professional league in the country, to attract more people into the sport. Thus, the Liga Dominicana de Fútbol was approved, as an attempt to raise the country's football profile. The first season began in 2014.

Competition format
In the first three installments, each team played 18 matches in the regular season with the 4 teams with most points qualifying for the playoffs. The champion was decided in a single-legged final.

The 2018 season wil grew from 10 to 12 teams with the arrival of San Francisco de Macoris (Atlético) and Bayaguana (Inter). Since Delfines from the Eastern part of the country joined, the LDF now have a team in each of the seven provinces and the National District, and the only professional league with a team in the South region San Cristóbal.

The tournament will feature 132 regular series matches. Each team will play 22 games in the regular phase (instead of the 18 of the first three editions), the six highest scoring will advance to the second phase, where they will play one against all in a round. The best four will advance to a semi-final with round-trip matches and the winners will play the championship in a single match, which extends the league calendar to 152 matches from 95 in 2017.

As a novelty, the LDF 2018 season will have a national and international television transmission chain that will bring to the small screen 60 matches at the local level and a number of meetings to be defined that will be taken to at least five nations of the region, including the United States and Mexico

The 2019 tournament of the Liga Dominicana de Futbol will start with 12 teams. The event will be developed with a new format, each of the twelve clubs can have up to 6 foreign players on their payroll.

The new format includes an "Apertura" and a "Clausura" tournament, both will be played one round and has been agreed with the twelve clubs and also with CONCACAF. The "Apertura" will have a semifinal with the four best teams and then a final, as well as the "Clausura".

Then the champion of each tournament will compete to win the qualification to the CONCACAF championship tournament. Another club will qualify for the CONCACAF tournament, accumulating the most points in both tournaments.

Teams

Former teams

Champions

2019 Liga Dominicana de Fútbol

Most goals

Stadiums and locations

Current LDF stadiums

References

External links
LDF official website

 
Football competitions in the Dominican Republic
Dom
Sports leagues established in 2015
2015 establishments in the Dominican Republic